Nathan Ball Bradley (May 28, 1831 – November 8, 1906) was a politician from the U.S. state of Michigan. He served two terms in the United States House of Representatives from 1873 to 1877.

Early life and education
Bradley was born in Lee, Massachusetts and moved with his parents to Lorain County, Ohio, in 1835 where he attended the common schools. He moved to Wisconsin in 1849 and was employed in a sawmill in the pine region. He returned to Ohio in 1850 and built and operated a sawmill until 1852, when he moved to Lexington, Michigan, and engaged in the manufacture of lumber.

He moved to St. Charles, in the Saginaw Valley, in 1855 and engaged in the lumber industry. He purchased a mill in Bay City, which he operated from 1858 to 1864. He also engaged in the salt industry in Bay City, where he was also justice of the peace for three terms, a supervisor one term, an alderman three terms, and the first mayor of Bay City after it obtained its charter in 1865. He was a member of the Michigan State Senate from 1866 to 1868. He also engaged in banking in 1867, becoming vice president of the First National Bank of Bay City.

Congress
Bradley was elected as a Republican and the first person to represent Michigan's 8th congressional district to the 43rd and 44th Congresses, serving from March 4, 1873, to March 3, 1877. He was not a candidate for renomination in 1876.

After Congress
After leaving Congress, he returned to the lumber business in Bay City and also was instrumental in establishing the first beet-sugar factory in the state. Bradley died in Bay City on November 8, 1906, and is interred in Elm Lawn Cemetery there.

References

The Political Graveyard

1831 births
1906 deaths
Republican Party Michigan state senators
People from Lee, Massachusetts
Republican Party members of the United States House of Representatives from Michigan
19th-century American politicians
People from Lorain County, Ohio
People from St. Charles, Michigan
People from Lexington, Michigan
People from Bay City, Michigan